Condate  is a genus of moths of the family Erebidae.

Taxonomy
The genus has previously been classified in the family Noctuidae.

Species
Condate angulina
Condate arenacea
Condate consocia
Condate costiplagiata
Condate fabularis
Condate flexus
Condate hypenoides
Condate orsilla
Condate purpurea
Condate purpureorufa
Condate retrahens
Condate rufistigma
Condate snelleni

References

Natural History Museum Lepidoptera genus database

Boletobiinae
Noctuoidea genera